Takashi Teraoka (September 13, 1942 – February 4, 2011) was a Japanese baseball player and coach. He played and coached for the Nankai Hawks and Hiroshima Carp of Nippon Professional Baseball. He also coached in South Korea's KBO League, and Taiwan's Chinese Professional Baseball League.

Teraoka died in Okinawa Prefecture on February 4, 2011, at the age of 68.

References

External links

1942 births
2011 deaths
Nippon Professional Baseball outfielders
Nippon Professional Baseball infielders
Nankai Hawks players
Hiroshima Carp players
Samsung Lions coaches
Japanese expatriate baseball people in South Korea
Japanese expatriate baseball people in Taiwan
Japanese baseball coaches
Baseball people from Miyazaki Prefecture
Wei Chuan Dragons coaches